Little Chicago may refer to:

Little Chicago (novel), a 2002 novel
Little Chicago, Minnesota, an unincorporated community
Little Chicago, South Carolina, an unincorporated community
Little Chicago, Wisconsin, an unincorporated community